The following lists events that happened during 2014 in Colombia.

Incumbents
 President: Juan Manuel Santos 
 Vice President: Angelino Garzón (until August 7), Germán Vargas Lleras (starting August 7)

Events

March
 March 9 - President Juan Manuel Santos's coalition wins a reduced majority, while former President Alvaro Uribe is elected to the Senate.

May
 May 18 - A bus in Fundación, department of Magdalena, ignites while transporting children from a religious service, killing 31 children.
 May 25 - Voters in Colombia go to the polls for the first round in the presidential election. Opposition candidate Óscar Iván Zuluaga wins a plurality of votes and will face the incumbent Juan Manuel Santos in the second round.

June
 June 15 - Voters in Colombia go to the polls for a presidential election, pitting incumbent Juan Manuel Santos against Óscar Iván Zuluaga. Santos is reelected with 51% of the vote.

August
 August 8 - Juan Manuel Santos is sworn in for a second term as President of Colombia.

November
 November 30 - FARC releases Colombian Army general Rubén Alzate and two other prisoners they recently captured.

References

 
Colombia
Years of the 21st century in Colombia
2010s in Colombia
Colombia